The 2000 NBA draft was held on June 28, 2000 at the Target Center in Minneapolis. It was the last draft held at the home arena of an NBA team until 2011; the following and subsequent drafts (through 2010) all took place at The Theater at Madison Square Garden in New York City (though Madison Square Garden itself is the home of the New York Knicks, they do not play in the theater). As of 2022, it is also the last NBA draft where a college senior was the number-one overall selection.

The 2000 draft class is considered one of the worst in NBA history. Few of its draftees would enjoy extended careers in the league. Just three of them -- top pick Kenyon Martin, first-round selection Jamaal Magloire (19th overall) and second-round pick Michael Redd (43rd overall) -- ever played in an NBA All-Star Game. Each of the three made their one and only All-Star appearance in 2004. Redd was the lone player from this draft to ever be chosen for an All-NBA Team (his sole appearance was on the third team in 2004). Only three players in this draft class won a major end-of-season award in their careers (Hedo Türkoğlu was named Most Improved Player in 2008, Mike Miller won both the NBA Rookie of the Year and NBA Sixth Man of the Year awards in 2001 and 2006 respectively, and Jamal Crawford was named 3x NBA Sixth Man of the Year in 2010, 2014 and 2016).

Sports Illustrated named this entire draft class (as opposed to individual players) the sixth biggest bust of the modern era – making it the only draft class among the site's top 20 list. Just before the 2009 draft, ESPN.com columnist David Schoenfield graded all of the drafts since the institution of the draft lottery in 1985, and the only draft to which he gave the lowest possible grade of 'F' was the 2000 draft. Using the WARP (wins above replacement player) metric, the 2000 NBA draft class collectively produced at a rate of 17.3 wins worse than a group of "average replacement players", effectively making this draft class the only one in NBA history to leave the league's talent pool worse than it had been on the morning of the draft.

Eight of the players selected in this draft never played in an NBA game in their professional basketball careers. Both of the players drafted by the San Antonio Spurs (Chris Carrawell and Cory Hightower) are among this group.

Draft selections

Notable undrafted players
These players were not selected in the 2000 NBA draft but have played at least one game in the NBA.

Early entrants

College underclassmen
The following college basketball players successfully applied for early draft entrance.

  Erick Barkley – G, St. John's (sophomore)
  Ernest Brown – C/F, Indian Hills CC (sophomore)
  Schea Cotton – G, Alabama (sophomore)
  Jamal Crawford – G, Michigan (freshman)
  Kaniel Dickens – F, Idaho (junior)
  Keyon Dooling – G, Missouri (sophomore)
  Khalid El-Amin – G, Connecticut (junior)
  Steve Eldridge – C, Henderson State (junior)
  Marcus Fizer – F, Iowa State (junior)
  Donnell Harvey – F, Florida (freshman)
  Cory Hightower – G/F, Indian Hills CC (sophomore)
  Rashaad Hines – G, Texas A&M–Corpus Christi (junior)
  Jimmie Hunter – G, Life (sophomore)
  DerMarr Johnson – F/G, Cincinnatii (freshman)
  Mark Karcher – F, Temple (junior)
  Andre Mahorn – F, Utah State (junior)
  Paul McPherson – G, DePaul (junior)
  Chris Mihm – C, Texas (junior)
  Mike Miller – F, Florida (sophomore)
  Jérôme Moïso – F, UCLA (sophomore)
  Joel Przybilla – C, Minnesota (sophomore)
  Michael Redd – G, Ohio State (junior)
  Quentin Richardson – G, DePaul (sophomore)
  JaRon Rush – F, UCLA (sophomore)
  Stromile Swift – F, LSU (sophomore)
  Derrick Worrell – F, Pittsburgh (junior)

High school players
The following high school players successfully applied for early draft entrance.

  Darius Miles – F, East St. Louis Senior High School (East St. Louis, Illinois)
  DeShawn Stevenson – G, Washington Union High School (Easton, California)

International players
The following international players successfully applied for early draft entrance.

  Aleksey Savrasenko – C, Olympiacos (Greece)
  Dalibor Bagarić – C, Benston Zagreb (Croatia)
  Primož Brezec – C, Olimpija (Slovenia)
  David Mushkudiani – F, Academic (Bulgaria)
  Stevan Nađfeji – F, Beobanka (FR Yugoslavia)
  Olumide Oyedeji – F, DJK Würzburg (Germany)
  Jake Tsakalidis – C, AEK (Greece)
  Hedo Türkoğlu – F, Efes Pilsen (Turkey)

See also
 List of first overall NBA draft picks

References

External links
 
 2000 NBA Draft at Basketball-reference.com

Draft
National Basketball Association draft
NBA draft
NBA draft
2000s in Minneapolis
Basketball in Minnesota
Events in Minneapolis
Sports in Minneapolis